Bhabar or Bhabhar  (Kumaoni: bhābar) is a region south of the Lower Himalayas and the Sivalik Hills in Kumaon, India, containing some of the largest cities of Kumaon, Haldwani and Ramnagar, both in Nainital District. It is the alluvial apron of sediments washed down from the Sivaliks along the northern edge of the Indo-Gangetic Plain.

Etymology
The name Bhabar refers to a local tall-growing grass, Eulaliopsis binata, used for the manufacture of paper and rope.

Overview
Bhabar plains are located in Kumaon. Bhabar is the gently-sloping coarse alluvial zone below the Sivalik Hills (outermost foothills of the Himalayas) where streams disappear into permeable sediments. The underground water level is deep in this region, then rises to the surface in the Terai below where coarse alluvium gives way to less permeable silt and clay. The Ganges River lies to the west and Sharda to the east.

Being at the junction of Himalayas and the Indo-Gangetic Plain, Bhabar contains almost all the important trade and commerce hubs of Kumaon, including its largest city Haldwani. Due to the top-soil replenishment every monsoon, It is also a fertile area with large yields per unit area.{citation needed|date=March 2019}

History
In 1901 Bhabar was also one of four division of Nainital district. It corresponded to the current 
subdivision of Haldwani. Bhabar lands were used by Gujjar Cattle herders of Kumaon and Garhwal. They spend their winters in bhabars.

References

External links
 Eulaliopsis binata at wikispecies

Uttarakhand
Geography of Uttarakhand
Himalayas